The following lists events in the year 2012 in the Central African Republic.

Incumbents
 President: François Bozizé

Events

February
19 February - Chadian rebels rob 40 people including a local government official.

December
19 December - Chad deploys troops into Bria to help Central African forces defend it from the Séléka rebels.
23 December - The Séléka take over Bambari after a string of small military successes.
27 December - President Bozizé asks for international help after rebels begin advancing on the capital of Bangui. The United States suspends its embassy operations in the country.
28 December - After weeks of unrest, the government and Séléka rebels agree to have talks.
29 December - Despite talks, Séléka rebels advance more and gain territory in the city of Bangui.
30 December - While rebels advance, Bozizé promises a national unity government to be formed.
31 December - The rebels reject Bozizé's national unity government proposal.

References

 
2010s in the Central African Republic
Years of the 21st century in the Central African Republic
Central African Republic
Central African Republic